The Afternoon Shift was a magazine programme on BBC Radio 4 that replaced the ill-fated Anderson Country. Running between 2 and 3pm, it was broadcast from 1995 to 1998. The programme was presented on Mondays and Fridays by Laurie Taylor and on Tuesdays, Wednesdays and Thursdays by Daire Brehan.

References

BBC Radio 4 programmes